USS Milwaukee (LCS-5) is a  of the United States Navy. She is the fifth ship to be named for the city of Milwaukee, the largest city in Wisconsin.

Design 
In 2002, the U.S. Navy initiated a program to develop the first of a fleet of littoral combat ships. The Navy initially ordered two monohull ships from Lockheed Martin, which became known as the Freedom-class littoral combat ships after the first ship of the class, . Odd-numbered U.S. Navy littoral combat ships are built using the Freedom-class monohull design, while even-numbered ships are based on a competing design, the trimaran hull  from General Dynamics. The initial order of littoral combat ships involved a total of four ships, including two of the Freedom-class design.  Milwaukee is the third Freedom-class littoral combat ship to be built.

Milwaukee includes additional stability improvements over the original Freedom design; the stern transom was lengthened and buoyancy tanks were added to the stern to increase weight service and enhance stability. The ship will also feature automated sensors to allow "conditions-based maintenance" and reduce crew overwork and fatigue issues that Freedom had on her first deployment.

Construction and career

She was laid down on 27 October 2011 at Marinette Marine, Marinette, Wisconsin; launched on 18 December 2013; sponsored by Mrs. Sylvia M. Panetta, wife of Secretary of Defense Leon E. Panetta; and commissioned on 21 November 2015.

Over the 2015 Labor Day weekend holiday, it was reported that Milwaukee generated waves greater than five feet tall during test runs near Door County's Chambers Island which damaged more than 40 boats. Milwaukee was still in the custody of Marinette Marine at the time of the incident and was conducting pre-commissioning acceptance trials. In June 2016, the Coast Guard announced that their investigation was complete and that no enforcement action would be taken against any of the parties involved.

Milwaukee completed her acceptance trials prior to 1 November 2015 and was commissioned in Milwaukee, Wisconsin on 21 November 2015. Her keel was laid down on 27 October 2011. Lockheed VP Joe North has said that starting with Milwaukee, the Lockheed LCS design is "done, locked and stable". One of the improvements for Milwaukee is specially designed waterjets that replace the commercial versions used on previous Littoral Combat Ships.

On 11 December 2015, on its way to San Diego from Halifax, Nova Scotia, the vessel experienced a "complete loss of propulsion" and was towed to Joint Expeditionary Base Little Creek, Virginia.

On 23 February 2016, CNN reported an update on the status of Milwaukee. In that update Navy Lt. Rebecca Haggard stated that Milwaukee "is designed to operate with gas turbine and diesel engines, which can operate in tandem or independently, In the case of Milwaukee when switching from one system to the other, a clutch failed to disengage as designed. Instead, the clutch remained spinning and some of the clutch gears were damaged." Lt. Haggard also stated that quick action by the crew prevented more serious problems and the damaged clutch was repaired in Virginia.

On 30 December 2016, Milwaukee participated in a homeport shift ceremony that took place at Naval Station Mayport. The ship was previously based out of Naval Base San Diego. She is assigned to Littoral Combat Ship Squadron Two.

On May 16, 2018, Milwaukee fired four "Longbow" Hellfire missiles at Fast Inshore Attack Craft (FIAC) targets, as part of an experimental platform development programme.

In 2021, the navy decided against decommissioning Milwaukee alongside several other older Freedom-class ships due to Milwaukees active testing of a new anti-submarine mission package.

On 2 April 2022, Milwaukee returned to Mayport following a deployment to the 4th Fleet.

On 29 July 2022, a major electrical fire damaged the ship while she was docked in Jacksonville.

On 19 October 2022, Milwaukee left Mayport for her second deployment in 2022.

In popular culture
USS Milwaukee is featured in the book Tom Clancy's Op-Center: Into the Fire.

References

External links

 

Freedom-class littoral combat ships
Lockheed Martin
2013 ships